is a Japanese football player for Mito HollyHock.

Playing career
Kusumoto was born in Tokyo on December 10, 1995. After graduating from Tokyo International University, he joined J2 League club Renofa Yamaguchi FC in 2018.

References

External links

1995 births
Living people
Tokyo International University alumni
Association football people from Tokyo
Japanese footballers
J2 League players
Renofa Yamaguchi FC players
Association football defenders